is a Japanese football player for Gainare Tottori on loan from Júbilo Iwata.

Playing career
Ryuolivier Iwamoto joined to Júbilo Iwata in 2015. In September 2016, he moved to Vanraure Hachinohe.

Club statistics
Updated to 23 February 2017.

References

External links

Profile at Júbilo Iwata
Profile at Vanraure Hachinohe
Profile at Gainare Tottori

1996 births
Living people
Association football people from Kagoshima Prefecture
Japanese footballers
J1 League players
J2 League players
J3 League players
Japan Football League players
Júbilo Iwata players
Vanraure Hachinohe players
Gainare Tottori players
J.League U-22 Selection players
Association football forwards